Tihamér Lukács (born 18 July 1980 in Miercurea Ciuc) is a Romanian-born Hungarian footballer.

Career
Tihamér started his career in little club Körmend, in 2000 signed with Szombathelyi Haladás. In June 2004 gone to Portugal and signed with União da Madeira. On next season played in Pécsi Mecsek FC and after that wear equipment of Zalaegerszegi TE. In January 2008 he signed with the Bulgarian club FC Vihren Sandanski.

External links
 hlsz.hu

1980 births
Living people
Sportspeople from Miercurea Ciuc
Romanian sportspeople of Hungarian descent
Hungarian footballers
Association football midfielders
Körmend FC footballers
Szombathelyi Haladás footballers
Büki TK Bükfürdő footballers
C.F. Estrela da Amadora players
C.F. União players
SC Fortuna Köln players
Pécsi MFC players
Zalaegerszegi TE players
OFC Vihren Sandanski players
FC Nizhny Novgorod (2007) players
BFC Siófok players
First Professional Football League (Bulgaria) players
Hungarian expatriate footballers
Expatriate footballers in Portugal
Expatriate footballers in Germany
Expatriate footballers in Bulgaria
Expatriate footballers in Russia
Expatriate footballers in Austria
Hungarian expatriate sportspeople in Portugal
Hungarian expatriate sportspeople in Germany
Hungarian expatriate sportspeople in Bulgaria
Hungarian expatriate sportspeople in Russia
Hungarian expatriate sportspeople in Austria